Area code 701 is a telephone area code in the North American Numbering Plan (NANP) for the U.S. State of North Dakota. It is one of the 86 original area codes created by AT&T in 1947, and continues to be the only area code in North Dakota, one of eleven states with only one area code.

Numbering plan area 701 is divided between the Bismarck and Fargo LATAs, and is one of only a few area codes so divided. The Fargo LATA extends for some distance into northern Minnesota, as far east as Brainerd.

Numbering plan exhaust projections forecast that North Dakota will not need a new area code until 2026. About 700 of the nearly 800 possible central office codes have been assigned. The danger of exhaustion comes from the proliferation of mobile services particularly in Fargo, Grand Forks and Bismarck.

Being the sole area code in North Dakota, seven-digit dialing is in effect for all calls within the state. The situation was threatened in 2020, when it was anticipated that the state had to transition to always dialing ten digits, because of the implementation of a short-code (988) for the National Suicide Prevention Lifeline, because that code was assigned as a central office prefix to an office (CLLI code BSMRNDJC) in Bismarck. However, the local telephone administration decided to discontinue this central office code, and return it to the NANP Administrator. This action removed the need to implement ten-digit dialing in area code 701, until relief is necessary in the future.

Service area and central office prefixes
 Abercrombie: 553
 Absaraka: 896
 Adams: 944
 Alamo: 528
 Alexander: 828
 Alice: 689
 Ambrose: 982
 Amidon: 879
 Aneta: 326
 Antler: 267
 Arnegard: 586
 Arthur: 967
 Ashley: 288
 Balta: 542
 Beach: 218, 872, 876
 Belfield: 559, 575, 719, 999
 Berthold: 453
 Beulah: 870, 873, 905
 Binford: 676
 Bisbee: 656, 767
 Bismarck: 202, 204, 214, 220, 221, 222, 223, 224, 226, 250, 255, 258, 319, 323, 328, 333, 354, 355, 390, 391, 400, 401, 415, 425, 426, 450, 471, 498, 516, 527, 530, 557, 595, 712, 751, 791, 801, 805, 877, 934, 946, 954, 955, 957, 975, 989.
 Bottineau: 201, 228, 480, 534, 871
 Bowbells: 310, 334, 339, 377, 705
 Bowdon: 962
 Bowman: 206, 440, 449, 458, 523
 Brocket: 655
 Buffalo: 633
 Burlington: 725
 Butte: 626
 Cando: 303, 900, 968
 Carpio: 468
 Carrington: 307, 649, 650, 652, 653, 717
 Carson: 622
 Casselton: 346, 347, 660, 895
 Cathay: 984
 Cavalier: 265, 521
 Center: 207, 301, 794, 920
 Christine: 998
 Colfax: 372
 Columbus: 939
 Cooperstown: 309, 789, 797
 Courtenay: 435
 Crary: 398
 Crete: 753
 Crosby: 965
 Crystal: 657
 Dahlen: 384
 Dazey: 733
 Deering: 728
 Des Lacs: 725
 Devils Lake: 230, 350, 351, 381, 544, 662, 665
 Dickey: 778
 Dickinson: 225, 227, 260, 264, 290, 300, 456, 483, 495, 502, 590, 690, 761, 802, 831
 Dodge: 632, 846
 Donnybrook: 482
 Douglas: 529
 Drake: 287, 465, 889
 Drayton: 454
 Dunn Center: 548
 Dunseith: 244, 472, 576
 East Carlyle: 688
 East Fairview: 695, 744, 844
 East Sidney: 481, 829
 East Westby: 985
 Edgeley: 493, 709, 830
 Edinburg: 993
 Edmore: 644
 Edmunds: 285
 Elgin: 584
 Ellendale: 344, 349, 535
 Emerado: 594, 631, 747, 935
 Emmet: 337, 661
 Enderlin: 437, 820, 912
 Epping: 859
 Esmond: 249
 Fairdale: 966
 Fairmount: 474, 514
 Fargo/West Fargo: 200, 205, 212, 219, 231, 232, 234, 235, 237, 238, 239, 241, 261, 271, 277, 280, 281, 282, 293, 297, 298, 306, 318, 353, 356, 361, 364, 365, 367, 371, 373, 388, 404, 405, 412, 417, 429, 433, 446, 451, 461, 476, 478, 491, 492, 499, 526, 532, 540, 541, 551, 552, 561, 566, 630, 639, 715, 729, 730, 781, 793, 799, 809, 850, 866, 893, 929, 936, 941, 951, 997
 Fessenden: 236, 547
 Finley: 524
 Flasher: 597
 Flaxton: 596
 Forbes: 357
 Fordville: 229
 Forman: 724
 Fort Ransom: 973
 Fort Totten: 766
 Fortuna: 601, 834
 Fort Yates: 455, 827, 854
 Fredonia: 698
 Fullerton: 375
 Gackle: 485
 Galesburg: 488
 Gardner: 342, 484, 638
 Garrison: 463, 836
 Gilby: 869
 Glenburn: 362
 Glen Ullin: 348
 Golden Valley: 983
 Goodrich: 884
 Grace City: 674
 Grafton: 352, 360, 379, 922
 Grand Forks: 203, 213, 215, 314, 317, 330, 335, 402, 610, 620, 732, 738, 739, 740, 741, 746, 757, 765, 772, 775, 777, 780, 787, 792, 795, 864, 885
 Grassy Butte: 863
 Great Bend: 545
 Grenora: 694
 Guelph: 710, 783
 Gwinner: 308, 678, 680
 Halliday: 692, 938
 Hampden: 868
 Hankinson: 242, 416
 Hannaford: 769
 Hannah: 283
 Harvey: 324, 341, 399, 635, 849
 Hatton: 543, 569, 963
 Hazelton: 782
 Hazen: 494, 748, 880, 891
 Hebron: 878
 Hettinger: 567, 637, 928
 Hickson: 369, 588, 598, 969
 Hillsboro: 289, 383, 430, 436, 636
 Hoople: 894
 Hope: 945
 Hunter: 874
 Inkster: 865
 Jamestown: 251, 252, 253, 269, 320, 368, 394, 419, 658, 659, 952
 Jud: 685
 Karlsruhe: 525
 Kathryn: 796
 Keene: 675
 Kenmare: 385, 835
 Killdeer: 764, 927
 Kindred: 409, 428, 718
 Kintyre: 332
 Knox: 583
 Kramer: 359
 Kulm: 647
 Ladd: 574
 Lakota: 247, 304
 LaMoure: 883
 Landa: 295
 Langdon: 256, 305, 370, 382, 686
 Lankin: 593
 Lansford: 784
 Larimore: 343, 431, 807
 Leeds: 466, 592
 Lehr: 378
 Leonard: 434, 645, 800
 Lidgerwood: 519, 538
 Lignite: 933
 Linton: 254, 321, 325, 329, 851
 Lisbon: 683
 Litchville: 762
 Maddock: 438
 Makoti: 726
 Mandan: 354, 445, 663, 667
 Mandaree: 759
 Manning: 573
 Manvel: 564, 696, 888
 Marion: 669
 Marmon: 826
 Martin: 625, 693
 Max: 679, 832
 Maxbass: 268
 Mayville: 380, 414, 786, 788
 McClusky: 363
 McGregor: 546
 McHenry: 785
 McKenzie: 562, 673
 McVille: 322
 Medina: 486
 Medora: 623
 Mercer: 447
 Merricourt: 396
 Metigoshe: 263, 389
 Michigan: 259, 270
 Milnor: 427
 Milton: 496
 Minnewaukan: 473
 Minot: 240, 340, 418, 420, 441, 500, 509, 578, 720, 721, 818, 822, 833, 837, 838, 839, 852, 857, 858
 Minot AFB: 723, 727
 Minto: 248, 358, 666
 Mohall: 756
 Mooreton: 274
 Mott: 824
 Munich: 682
 Napoleon: 754
 Neche: 886
 Nekoma: 949
 Nelvik: 374
 Newburg: 272
 New Effington: 634
 New England: 579
 New Leipzig: 584
 New Rockford: 302, 600, 947, 972
 New Salem: 843
 New Town: 421, 627
 Niagara: 397
 Nome: 924
 Noonan: 925
 Norma: 467
 North Britton: 443
 North Hecla: 992
 North Lemmon: 376
 North McIntosh: 276, 815
 North McLaghlin: 827
 North Morristn: 522, 937
 North Veblen: 736
 Northwood: 581, 587
 Oakes: 210, 408, 742
 Oberon: 798
 Osnabrock: 496
 Page: 668
 Park River: 284, 331
 Parshall: 312, 862, 897, 898
 Pekin: 296
 Pembina: 825
 Penn: 393
 Petersburg: 345
 Pettibone: 273
 Pick City: 487
 Plaza: 497
 Portal: 926
 Powers Lake: 464
 Ray: 568
 Reeder: 691, 853
 Regan: 286
 Regent: 209, 563, 589
 Reynolds: 841, 847
 Rhame: 279, 582
 Richardton: 956, 974
 Robinson: 392
 Rocklake: 266
 Rolette: 246, 507, 560
 Rolla: 278, 477, 550, 953
 Roseglen: 743
 Ross: 755
 Round Prairie: 702, 875
 Rugby: 208, 681, 771, 776, 855, 881
 Ryder: 758
 St. Anthony: 445
 St. Thomas: 257, 520
 Sanborn: 646
 Sarles: 697
 Sawyer: 624
 Scranton: 275, 533
 Selfridge: 422
 Sheldon: 882
 Sherwood: 459
 Sheyenne: 996
 Souris: 243
 South Heart: 413, 677
 South Prairie: 722
 Spencer: 217, 848, 923
 Squaw Gap: 565
 Stanley: 313, 621, 628, 629
 Stanton: 745
 Starkweather: 233, 292
 Steele: 316, 475, 556
 Sterling: 387
 Strasburg: 336
 Streeter: 424
 Sykeston: 984
 Tappen: 327
 Thompson: 554, 599
 Tioga: 216, 641, 648, 664
 Tolley: 386
 Tolna: 262
 Tower City: 749
 Towner: 537
 Turtle Lake: 448, 531
 Tuttle: 867
 Underwood: 442, 654, 980
 Upham: 768
 Valley City: 490, 760, 840, 845, 890
 Velva: 338
 Venturia: 684
 Verona: 432
 Wahpeton: 403, 591, 640, 642, 671, 672, 892, 899
 Walcott: 469
 Wales: 283
 Walhalla: 549, 821
 Warwick: 294
 Washburn: 315, 460, 462, 558, 737, 861
 Watford City: 444, 842
 Webster: 395
 West Climax: 856
 Westhope: 245
 West Halstad: 457
 West Oslo: 699
 West Nielsville: 942
 West Perley: 860
 West Shelby: 887
 Wildrose: 539
 Williston: 570, 571, 572, 577, 580, 609, 651, 713, 770, 774, 901, 978
 Willow City: 366, 687
 Wilton: 734
 Windsor: 763
 Wing: 943
 Wishek: 452, 731
 Woodworth: 752
 Wyndmere: 439
 York: 592
 Ypsilanti: 489
 Zap: 948
 Zeeland: 423
 Premium calls (unassigned): 211, 311, 406, 411, 470, 479, 511, 536, 555, 605, 611, 700, 701, 711, 811, 823, 911, 921, 950, 958, 959, 976.

See also
List of NANP area codes

References

External links

Directory-assistance.net (701)
Interactive map of area code 701

701
701
Telecommunications-related introductions in 1947